David Shemilt (born 22 August 1964) is a Canadian swimmer. He competed in two events at the 1984 Summer Olympics.

References

External links
 

1964 births
Living people
Canadian male swimmers
Olympic swimmers of Canada
Swimmers at the 1984 Summer Olympics
Swimmers from Toronto
Universiade medalists in swimming
Universiade bronze medalists for Canada
Medalists at the 1983 Summer Universiade